Kathiramangalam is a village in the Thiruvidaimarudur taluk of Thanjavur district in Tamil Nadu, India. It is situated on the border with Tiruvarur and Nagapattinam districts. The place is known for Kathiramangalam Vana Durga Temple.

References 

 Map of Thiruvidaimarudur taluk

Villages in Thanjavur district